Moseley Shoals Records is an independent record label in the United Kingdom.  The company was set up by British rock band Ocean Colour Scene in 2004, so that they could release their Live Acoustic at the Jam House album.  The name Moseley Shoals is taken from their breakthrough second album Moseley Shoals.  Moseley is an area of Birmingham where the band formed, and they named their recording studio Moseley Shoals in deference to Muscle Shoals Sound recording studio in Muscle Shoals, Alabama.

The serial codes on this label all begin with "OCS" which is a reference to the band's name "Ocean Colour Scene"

Discography

Albums
Ocean Colour Scene - Live Acoustic at the Jam House [Limited Edition] - 2006 - OCSCD2
Ocean Colour Scene - On the Leyline - 2007 - OCSCD5

Singles
"I Told You So" [CD1/CD2/Limited Blue 7'] - CDOCS1/CXOCS1/7OCS1
"I Just Got Over You" [CD/Limited Red 7"] - CDOCS2/7OCS2
"Go To Sea" [FREE DOWNLOAD from www.oceancolourscene.com]

DVDs
Live at the Town Hall - OCSDVD1

See also
 List of record labels

References
Discogs.com
HMV.com

External links
 Official website

Record labels based in Birmingham, West Midlands
Ocean Colour Scene
British independent record labels
Record labels established in 2004
Vanity record labels
Rock record labels